Mikael Österberg (born  in Tyresö, Stockholm County) is a Swedish professional ice hockey defenceman. He played 4 games in AIK of the Elitserien (SEL) in the 2010–11 season.

References 
 

Living people
1986 births
AIK IF players
Swedish ice hockey defencemen
Sportspeople from Stockholm County